Copenhagen Airport, Kastrup is an international airport serving Copenhagen, Denmark, Zealand, the Øresund Region, and southern Sweden including Scania. It is the second largest airport in the Nordic countries.

As of 2019, the airport was the largest airport in the Nordic countries with close to 30.3 million passengers. It is one of the oldest international airports in Europe, the fourth-busiest airport in Northern Europe, and the busiest for international travel in Scandinavia.

Most of the airport is in the municipality of Tårnby, with a small part in the city of Dragør.

The airport is the main hub out of three used by Scandinavian Airlines and is also an operating base for Sunclass Airlines and Norwegian Air Shuttle. Copenhagen Airport handles around 60 scheduled airlines, and has a maximum operation capability of 83 operations/hour, and a total of 108 jet bridges and remote parking stands. Unlike other Scandinavian airports, most of the airport's passengers are international. In 2015, 6.1% of passengers travelled to and from other Danish airports, 83.5% to/from other European airports, and 10.4% were intercontinental passengers. The airport is owned by Københavns Lufthavne, which also operates Roskilde Airport. The airport employs 1,700 people (not including employees in shops, restaurants, etc.).

Copenhagen Airport was originally called Kastrup Airport, after  the small town of Kastrup, now part of the Tårnby municipality. The formal name is still Copenhagen Airport, Kastrup, to distinguish it from Roskilde Airport.

History

The airport was inaugurated 20 April 1925 and was one of the first civil airports in the world. It consisted of a large, impressive terminal built of wood, a couple of hangars, a balloon mast, a hydroplane landing stage and a few grassy meadows that could be used as runways. The grass on the runways was kept short by sheep, which were shepherded away before take-offs and landings. From 1932 to 1939, takeoffs and landings increased from 6,000 to 50,000 and passenger number increased to 72,000. Between 1936 and 1939, a new terminal was built, considered one of the finest examples of Nordic functionalism. The terminal was designed by Vilhelm Lauritzen, who was considered a pioneer among architects, in terms not only of architecture and construction, but also of service and passenger comfort.

In the years of World War II, the Copenhagen airport was closed for civil operations except for periodic flights to destinations in Sweden, Germany, and Austria. In the summer of 1941 the first hard-surface runway opened. When World War II ended in May 1945, Copenhagen had the most modern international airport in Europe, because the airport remained untouched by actual acts of war.

On 1 August 1947, Scandinavian Airlines (SAS) was founded, an important event for the Copenhagen Airport, as Copenhagen was to be the main hub for the airline. Traffic increased rapidly in the first years SAS operated. On 26 January 1947, a KLM Douglas DC-3 "Dakota" crashed at the airport after stopping en route to Stockholm. 22 people on board died, including the Swedish prince Gustav Adolf and the American opera singer Grace Moore. In 1948, Copenhagen airport was third largest airport in Europe with 150 daily takeoffs and almost 300,000 passengers for the year. The airport continued its rapid growth. The terminal was expanded several times and new hangars were erected.

In 1954, Scandinavian Airlines begins the world's first trans-polar route, flying initially to Los Angeles. The route proved to be a publicity coup, and for some years Copenhagen became a popular transit point for Hollywood stars and producers flying to Europe – also the airport handled 11,000 tonnes of freight per year. In 1956, the airport handled 1 million passengers per year and won the award for the world's best airport. The runways were lengthened and fitted with technically advanced equipment.

By 10 May 1960, when the new airport terminal (now Terminal 2) was inaugurated, the daily number of jet operations had increased to 28, and still traffic kept on growing. The large new airport terminal soon became too small, and in 1969 yet another huge expansion programme was launched. Domestic traffic was relocated to a new domestic terminal (the eastern part of Terminal 1). The (current) international terminal was supplemented with a new pier (C) and a separate arrivals hall (the building between Terminals 2 and 3). When the comprehensive expansion was completed in 1972, the number of take-offs and landings exceeded 180,000 and there were more than eight million passengers.

Throughout the 1970s, airport traffic continued to grow, but the airport was not expanded further. A new large airport located at the island of Saltholm (with a connecting bridge to Denmark and Sweden) was on the drawing board. It would be a huge investment, and the proposal was evaluated thoroughly by many experts. In 1980, however, the Danish parliament instead decided to expand the capacity of Copenhagen airport to 20–22 million passengers by the year 2000. This solution was far cheaper than building a new airport and because the new types of aircraft were less noisy, an airport on Saltholm did not offer a decisive environmental gain. In 1973 the airport handled 8 million passengers per year. The third (long) runway opened and the dual runway system (04L/22R-04R/22L) opened, strongly expanding the starts and landings capacity.

The expansion of the airport began in 1982, after the necessary period of planning. The intention was not to build Europe's largest airport, but to build transit passengers' favourite airport. A stay at the airport was supposed to be an integral part of the travel experience. Efficiency and precision were obvious demands, but focus was also on generating an oasis where international travellers could relax: beautiful architecture, Scandinavian design, and pleasant, light, and comfortable surroundings with plenty of shops, restaurants, and other facilities providing enjoyment and pleasure. The new cargo terminal was built in the eastern area of the airport.

From 1984, SAS operated a marine link from the airport to Malmö, across the Øresund to a dedicated terminal in Malmö where luggage could be checked in. From 1984 to 1994, the service was operated by hovercraft, whereas from 1994 to 2000 catamarans were used.  The marine link closed in 2000 due to the opening of the Øresund Bridge.

A number of important construction projects were completed in 1998: a pier connecting the domestic and international terminals; a new arrivals hall; new modern baggage handling facilities; an underground railway station with two large underground parking facilities with 2400 spaces opens; and above it all the spacious and impressive delta-shaped terminal (Terminal 3) with 17 million passengers capacity. The first stage of the new Pier D was completed in the spring of 1999.

On 1 July 2000 the Øresund Bridge opened which connects Denmark and Sweden by motorway and train. In 2001 the five-star Hilton hotel opened with 382 rooms. In 2006 for the first time in its history Copenhagen airport exceeded 20 million passengers and reached 20,900,000 passengers. In October 2007 the metro station opened, connecting the airport to the Copenhagen Metro. A new control tower opened in 2008 by Naviair as part of a major renovation of the ATC system. Airport officials announced plans to build a new low-cost terminal at the facility. On 31 October 2010 the new low cost terminal CPH Go opened by easyJet. In 2013 the airport handled a new record of 24,067,030 passengers. In 2014 CPH announced plans to increase capacity to 40 million passengers per year. It reached 30 million in 2018.

From late 2015, the airport became the first in Scandinavia to have a regularly scheduled A380 service after Emirates started operating the plane for its Copenhagen route.

Due to the COVID-19 pandemic the number of passengers fell dramatically during 2020. There were 7.525 million passengers this year, a majority of these in January and February when restrictions were yet not issued. The Group Annual Report 2020 showed 600 million DKK in deficit.

Facilities

Terminals
Copenhagen Airport has two terminals for check-in, Terminals 2 and 3, which handle all flights and share a common airside passenger concourse as well as the arrivals section which houses customs and baggage claim and is physically located in Terminal 3. The airside is reached through a common security check located between Terminal 2 and Terminal 3.

The common airside passenger concourse is divided into piers, called A, B, C, D, E and F. Pier A and B are for flights inside Schengen only. Pier C is mostly for flights outside Schengen. Pier D is mostly for flights inside Schengen. The newest section, CPH Go, now called Pier F, dedicated to low-cost carriers opened in October 2010. So far, EasyJet, Transavia and Ryanair are the only airlines operating from this facility. An all new Terminal 4 has been discussed, but replaced by plans to expand the current facilities in appropriate increments. Copenhagen Airport says passengers have easy transfer possibilities.

Previously all domestic flights departed from Terminal 1, but from 29 March 2015 all departures have been collected in Terminals 2 and 3, and Pier C was expanded with another jetbridge at DKK 10M to facilitate the Emirates Airbus A380 to Dubai from December 2015, which was the first 2-class A380 carrying 615 passengers.

Pier E began construction in 2016 and was finished in May 2019 and opened on June 4, 2019.
SAS have moved most of its long haul flight from pier C to E.

Runways
Despite the short distance to the city centre, approaches to, and departures from, the airport are above water due to the heading of the dual parallel runway system (04R/22L & 04L/22R). Those runways point to the Øresund strait, close in both directions. The supplementary runway (30/12) oriented perpendicular to the main runways also has its approach or departure over Øresund in one direction. In the opposite direction, the 30/12 runway has noise restrictions as flight happens close over residential areas. Other advantages are the low altitude of the airport and absence of hills and high buildings below the approach directions. In case of fog, the runway 22L is equipped with an ILS category III C system, which allows modern aircraft to land in zero sight. Runway 04R/22L was widened by 4 meters in each side at DKK 30M to accommodate the Airbus A380, as part of a general concrete renewal program of DKK 300M.

Airlines and destinations

Passenger
The following airlines operate regular scheduled and charter flights at Copenhagen Airport:

Cargo

Statistics

Passenger numbers

Busiest routes

Other facilities
The SAS traffic office resides at Copenhagen Airport South and in Dragør, together with a VIP terminal. The VIP terminal is actually the first terminal building, from the 1920s. It was moved about 2 km during the 1990s.

In 2015, Boeing opened a maintenance, repair, and operations facility at CPH, as proximity to daily operations is more important than high wages when checks have to be made every 1,000 flight hours.

Ground transport

Within the airport area, special airport buses depart every 15 minutes. The bus line connects all terminals and parking lot areas and uses in all 11 bus stops. The transport is free of charge for all. During a few night hours, the buses depart every 20 minutes instead.

Train

The airport's station is located underneath Terminal 3 on the Øresund Railway Line.

 The station is served by trains operated by DSB Øresund as part of the Øresundståg service. These trains, running as local services between Copenhagen city centre and Helsingør, have a dense stopping pattern inside Denmark. Øresundståg also operates regional and intercity trains to destinations across the south of Sweden: Malmö, Gothenburg, Kalmar, Karlskrona, and Kristianstad.
DSB, the Danish national rail operator, have InterCity and InterCityExpress trains calling at this station. Domestic destinations include Esbjerg, Aarhus, Aalborg and Sønderborg.
 Swedish SJ runs several high-speed trains with daily departures between Copenhagen central station (København H) and Stockholm central station (Stockholm C) and Gothenburg (Göteborg). These trains all call at the Copenhagen Airport station (København Lufthavn/Kastrup).

Metro
Line M2 of the Copenhagen Metro links the airport with the city centre in around 15 minutes. The Metro station is two floors above the underground rail station and continues on elevated tracks until it goes underground after 5 stations. The metro trains run very frequently, in rush hours every four minutes, outside rush hours and on weekends every six minutes, and every 15/20 minutes at night. The metro runs to Kongens Nytorv station amongst other stations, from where you can connect to the new City Circle that runs through the Østerbro, Nørrebro, Frederiksberg districts amongst other places in Copenhagen.

Road
 Movia buses 5C, 35, 36 and Gråhundbus line 999 all stop at the airport; bus 888, express-bus to Jutland, also stops at the airport. Movia bus 2A stops near the airport. There are long-distance buses to Sweden and Norway operated by Swebus: 820 to Oslo via Gothenburg and 832 to Uppsala via Stockholm. GoByBus and Bus4You also operate the same routes.
 The E20 motorway runs right by the airport. The E20 uses the toll road Øresund Bridge to Sweden. The airport has 8,600 parking spaces.

Incidents and accidents

 On 6 July 2022, a British Airways Airbus A320 caught fire as it was landing. Airport firefighters put out the fire with the use of firefighting foam. People in the terminal buildings were able to record the footage.

See also
 List of airports in Denmark
 List of the busiest airports in the Nordic countries
 List of the busiest airports in the European Union

Notes

References

External links
 
 
 

Airport
Airports in Denmark
Airfields of the United States Army Air Forces Air Transport Command in the European Theater
Airports established in 1925
Buildings and structures in Tårnby Municipality
Buildings and structures in Dragør Municipality
1925 establishments in Denmark
Airports in the Øresund Region
International airports in Denmark